Abdulla Al-Haza'a (born 19 July 1990) is a Bahraini professional footballer who plays as a defender.

International goals
Scores and results list Bahrain's goal tally first.

Honours 
Bahrain
Winner
 Pan Arab Games: 2011

External links 
 

1990 births
Living people
Bahraini footballers
Bahrain international footballers
Association football defenders
2015 AFC Asian Cup players
Footballers at the 2010 Asian Games
Asian Games competitors for Bahrain
Bahrain youth international footballers
Hidd SCC players
Al Tadhamon SC players
East Riffa Club players
Bahraini expatriate footballers
Bahraini expatriate sportspeople in Kuwait
Expatriate footballers in Kuwait
Kuwait Premier League players
Bahraini Premier League players